Addison Alexander MacKenzie,  (1 November 1885 – 13 May 1970) was a Canadian politician, who represented York North in the Legislative Assembly of Ontario from 1945 to 1967 as a Progressive Conservative member.

Background
MacKenzie was born to Douglas MacKenzie and Lydia Ann Addison in Woodbridge, Ontario (today a district in the City of Vaughan) on a farm (Lot 5 Concession 7) that was originally a land grant to his great-grandfather (and settled by his grandfather William MacKenzie (1819-1904) in 1842). He was educated in Woodbridge and then worked at a variety of jobs across the country.

In 1914, at the start of First World War, he enlisted in the 4th Battalion, Canadian Mounted Rifles and quickly rose to the rank of Major, due to his previous experience serving in the militia (The Governor General's Body Guard).

During the Battle of the Somme, MacKenzie led a reconnaissance party to observe the effects of the artillery fire and later led his men and assaulted the Germans positions. His efforts that day would earn him the Military Cross. The citation read: "For conspicuous gallantry in action. He carried out a daring reconnaissance of the enemy's wire in daylight. Later he led his Company with great courage and determination, greatly assisting the bombers by sniping the enemy as they brought up reinforcements."

MacKenzie went on to participate in the Battle of Vimy Ridge, leading the 4th company. During the action he was hit by shrapnel from an artillery shell and was seriously wounded. After the battle, he praised the men of his command, "What I say about our Toronto boys is true in every other branch of the army. We fought Monday, not for cities, but for Canada. Every Canadian battalion did well." His wounds were serious enough that he spent the rest of the war behind the front lines. He returned to farming after the war. Every Thanksgiving he held a turkey dinner for his neighbours.

Politics
He developed an interest in politics and served on Woodbridge Town Council before running for provincial office.

He ran as the Progressive Conservative candidate in York North in 1943 but was defeated by CCF member, George Mitchell. In 1945 he ran again, this time defeating Mitchell.

He served as a backbench member of the house for the next 22 years, finally retiring in 1967. He was not known as a strong speaker having made only two speeches but was remembered as a strong advocate for his riding constituents.

Later life
After retiring from politics, MacKenzie sat on the Board of the Metropolitan Toronto Conservation Authority and he was a charter member of the Woodbridge Horticultural Society. Just before his death he was on his way to Peel Memorial Hospital when his ambulance was slowed by a parade. Upon learning who was in the ambulance, the marching pipers insisted on escorting him to the hospital.

In recognition of his long public service, Major Mackenzie Drive, a main east–west thoroughfare in York Region, and Alexander Mackenzie High School, in Richmond Hill, Ontario, were named after him, as is Royal Canadian Legion Branch 414, in Woodbridge, Vaughan.

References

External links 
 

1885 births
1970 deaths
Progressive Conservative Party of Ontario MPPs